Los Reyes (Spanish: "the kings") is a municipality in the Mexican state of Veracruz, located about  south of the state capital Xalapa.

Geography
The municipality of Los Reyes is located in the Sierra de Zongolica, which are foothills of the Sierra Madre Oriental in central Veracruz. It borders the municipalities of Tequila to the north, Zongolica to the east, Texhuacán to the south, Tlaquilpa to the southwest, and Atlahuilco to the west.

The land in Los Reyes is mostly either forested (64%) or used as farmland (33%). Luvisols predominate in the municipality. The municipality is located in the Papaloapan River basin. Federal Highway 123 runs through the municipality from northwest to east, forming part of the municipal border between Los Reyes and Atlahuilco.

Los Reyes's climate is generally temperate and humid.

History
The original name for the area was Cozcatlán (Nahuatl: "place of jewels"). According to the Historia Tolteca-Chichimeca a group of Nahuatl-speaking Nonoalca known as the Cozcatecah settled in the Cozcatlán area around 1050, which formed part of the historical region of Nonoalco.

On 28 March 1831, a municipality called Los Santos Reyes de Coscatla was incorporated in the area, forming part of the canton of Orizaba in the state of Veracruz. On 4 June 1888 Los Reyes annexed the municipality of Atlanca. Los Reyes became a free municipality on 15 January 1918.

Administration
The municipal government comprises a president, a councillor (Spanish: síndico), and a trustee (regidor). The current president of the municipality is Eclicerio Tequiliquihua Quiahuixtle.

Demographics
In the 2010 Mexican Census, the municipality of Los Reyes recorded a population of 5484 inhabitants living in 1261 households. The 2015 Intercensal Survey estimated a population of 5830 inhabitants in Los Reyes, 98.40% of whom reported being of Indigenous ancestry. In the 2010 Census, 4699 people or 86% of the population in Los Reyes reported speaking an Indigenous language, of which 4478 spoke Nahuatl.

There are 20 localities in the municipality, of which only the municipal seat, also called Los Reyes, is classified as urban. It recorded a population of 963 inhabitants in the 2010 Census.

Economy
The main economic activity in Los Reyes is farming and corn is the main crop grown.

References

Municipalities of Veracruz
1831 establishments in Mexico
States and territories established in 1831